In mathematics, an iterated function is a function  (that is, a function from some set  to itself) which is obtained  by composing another function  with itself a certain number of times. The process of repeatedly applying the same function is called iteration. In this process, starting from some initial object, the result of applying a given function is fed again in the function as input, and this process is repeated. For example on the image on the right:
with the circle‑shaped symbol of function composition.

Iterated functions are objects of study in computer science, fractals,  dynamical systems, mathematics and renormalization group physics.

Definition
The formal definition of an iterated function on a set X follows.

Let  be a set and  be a function.

and

That is, 
, 
always associative.

Because the notation  may refer to both iteration (composition) of the function  or exponentiation of the function  (the latter is commonly used in trigonometry), some mathematicians choose to use  to denote the compositional meaning, writing  for the -th iterate of the function , as in, for example,  meaning . For the same purpose,  was used by Benjamin Peirce whereas Alfred Pringsheim and Jules Molk suggested  instead.

Abelian property and iteration sequences

 

This is structurally identical to the property of exponentiation that , i.e. the special case .

Schröder's equation and Abel equation. On a logarithmic scale, this reduces to the nesting property of Chebyshev polynomials, since  .

The relation   also holds, analogous to the property of exponentiation that  .

The sequence of functions   is called a Picard sequence, named after Charles Émile Picard.

If   for some integer , the orbit is called a periodic orbit. The point  itself is called a periodic point. The cycle detection problem in computer science is the algorithmic problem of finding the first periodic point in an orbit, and the period of the orbit.

Fixed points

There exist a number of fixed-point theorems that guarantee the existence of fixed points in various situations, including the Banach fixed point theorem and the Brouwer fixed point theorem.

There are several techniques for convergence acceleration of the sequences produced by fixed point iteration. For example, the Aitken method applied to an iterated fixed point is known as Steffensen's method, and produces quadratic convergence.

Limiting behaviour

Upon iteration, one may find that there are sets that shrink and converge towards a single point. In such a case, the point that is converged to is known as an attractive fixed point. Conversely, iteration may give the appearance of points diverging away from a single point; this would be the case for an unstable fixed point.  
When the points of the orbit converge to one or more limits, the set of accumulation points of the orbit is known as the limit set or the ω-limit set.

The ideas of attraction and repulsion generalize similarly; one may categorize iterates into stable sets and unstable sets, according to the behaviour of small neighborhoods under iteration. (Also see Infinite compositions of analytic functions.)

Other limiting behaviours are possible; for example, wandering points are points that move away, and never come back even close to where they started.

Invariant measure
If one considers the evolution of a density distribution, rather than that of individual point dynamics, then the limiting behavior is given by the invariant measure. It can be visualized as the behavior of a point-cloud or dust-cloud under repeated iteration. The invariant measure is an eigenstate of the Ruelle-Frobenius-Perron operator or transfer operator, corresponding to an eigenvalue of 1. Smaller eigenvalues correspond to unstable, decaying states.

In general, because repeated iteration corresponds to a shift, the transfer operator, and its adjoint, the Koopman operator can both be interpreted as shift operators action on a shift space.  The theory of subshifts of finite type provides general insight into many iterated functions, especially those leading to chaos.

Fractional iterates and flows, and negative iterates

The notion  must be used with care when the equation  has multiple solutions, which is normally the case, as in Babbage's equation of the functional roots of the identity map. The issue is quite similar to the expression "0/0" in arithmetic. A trivial root of f can always be obtained if fs domain can be extended sufficiently, cf. picture. The roots chosen are normally the ones belonging to the orbit under study.

Fractional iteration of a function can be defined: for instance, a half iterate of a function  is a function  such that . This idea can be generalized so that the iteration count  becomes a continuous parameter, a sort of continuous "time" of a continuous orbit.

In such cases, one refers to the system as a flow. (cf. Section on conjugacy below.)

Negative iterates correspond to function inverses and their compositions. Fractional negative iterates are defined analogously to fractional positive ones; for example,  is defined such that , or, equivalently, such that .

Some formulas for fractional iteration

One of several methods of finding a series formula for fractional iteration, making use of a fixed point, is as follows.

 First determine a fixed point for the function such that .
 Define  for all n belonging to the reals. This, in some ways, is the most natural extra condition to place upon the fractional iterates.
 Expand  around the fixed point a as a Taylor series, 
 Expand out 
 Make use of the geometric progression to simplify terms,  There is a special case when , 
This can be carried on indefinitely, although inefficiently, as the latter terms become increasingly complicated. A more systematic procedure is outlined in the following section on Conjugacy.

Example 1
For example, setting  gives the fixed point , so the above formula terminates to just

which is trivial to check.

Example 2
Find the value of  where this is done n times (and possibly the interpolated values when n is not an integer). We have .

So set  and  expanded around the fixed point value of 2 is then an infinite series,

which, taking just the first three terms, is correct to the first decimal place when n is positive–cf. Tetration: . (Using the other fixed point  causes the series to diverge.)

For , the series computes the inverse function .

Example 3
With the function , expand around the fixed point 1 to get the series

which is simply the Taylor series of x(bn ) expanded around 1.

Conjugacy

Thus, if one can solve for one iterated function system, one also  has solutions for all topologically conjugate systems. For example, the tent map is topologically conjugate to the logistic map.
,     for any function .

Making the substitution  yields 
,    a form known as the Abel equation.

Even in the absence of a strict homeomorphism, near a fixed point, here taken to be at  = 0, (0) = 0, one may often solve Schröder's equation for a function Ψ, which makes  locally conjugate to a mere dilation, that is  
.

Thus, its iteration orbit, or flow, under suitable provisions (e.g.), amounts to the conjugate of the orbit of the monomial,
,  
where  in this expression serves as a plain exponent: functional iteration has been reduced to multiplication!  Here, however, the exponent  no longer needs be integer or positive, and is a continuous "time" of evolution for the full orbit: the monoid of the Picard sequence (cf. transformation semigroup) has generalized to a full continuous group.

This method (perturbative determination of the principal eigenfunction Ψ, cf. Carleman matrix) is equivalent to the algorithm of the preceding section, albeit, in practice,  more powerful and systematic.

Markov chains
If the function is linear and can be described by a stochastic matrix, that is, a matrix whose rows or columns sum to one, then the iterated system is known as a Markov chain.

Examples
There are many chaotic maps. 
Well-known iterated functions include the Mandelbrot set and iterated function systems.

Ernst Schröder, in 1870, worked out special cases of the logistic map, such as the chaotic case , so that , hence .

A nonchaotic case Schröder also illustrated with his method, yielded , and hence  .

If  is the action of a group element on a set, then the iterated function corresponds to a free group.

Most functions do not have explicit general closed-form expressions for the n-th iterate. The table below lists some that do. Note that all these expressions are valid even for non-integer and negative n, as well as non-negative integer n.

Choosing b = 2 = –a and b = 4 = –a, respectively, further reduces them to the nonchaotic and chaotic logistic cases discussed prior to the table.

Some of these examples are related among themselves by simple conjugacies. A few further examples, essentially amounting to simple conjugacies of Schröder's examples  can be found in ref.

Means of study
Iterated functions can be studied with the Artin–Mazur zeta function and with transfer operators.

In computer science
In computer science, iterated functions occur as a special case of recursive functions, which in turn anchor the study of such broad topics as lambda calculus, or narrower ones, such as the denotational semantics of computer programs.

Definitions in terms of iterated functions
Two important functionals can be defined in terms of iterated functions. These are summation:

and the equivalent product:

Functional derivative
The functional derivative of an iterated function is given by the recursive formula:

Lie's data transport equation

Given the iteration velocity, or beta function (physics),  
 
for the th iterate of the function , we have

For example, for rigid advection, if , then .  Consequently, action by a plain shift operator.

Conversely, one may   specify   given an arbitrary , through the generic Abel equation  discussed above,

where

This is evident by noting that 

For continuous iteration index , then, now written as a subscript, this amounts to Lie's celebrated exponential realization of a continuous group,

The initial flow velocity  suffices to determine the entire flow, given this exponential realization which automatically provides the  general solution to the translation functional equation,

See also

 Irrational rotation
 Iterated function system
 Iterative method
 Rotation number
 Sarkovskii's theorem
 Fractional calculus
 Recurrence relation
 Schröder's equation
 Functional square root
 Abel function
 Infinite compositions of analytic functions
 Flow (mathematics)
 Tetration
 Functional equation

Notes

References

External Links

Dynamical systems
Fractals
Sequences and series
Fixed points (mathematics)
Functions and mappings
Functional equations